Kim Mi-Yong (also Kim Mi-Yeong, ; born May 6, 1983 in Nampo, Pyeongannam) is a North Korean table tennis player. She won a gold medal, as a member of the North Korea table tennis team, at the 2002 Asian Games in Busan, South Korea, and silver at the 2001 World Table Tennis Championships in Osaka, Japan. As of January 2010, Kim is ranked no. 84 in the world by the International Table Tennis Federation (ITTF). Kim is a member of the table tennis team for Abrokkang Sports Club, and is coached and trained by Ri To Yong. She is also left-handed, and uses the offensive, classic grip.

Kim qualified for the women's singles tournament, along with her teammate Kim Jong at the 2008 Summer Olympics in Beijing, by receiving a place as one of the top 7 seeded players from the Asian Qualification Tournament in Hong Kong. She received a single bye for the first round match, before losing out to Lithuania's Rūta Paškauskienė, with a set score of 3–4.

References

External links
 
 NBC 2008 Olympics profile

1983 births
Living people
People from Nampo
North Korean female table tennis players
Table tennis players at the 2008 Summer Olympics
Olympic table tennis players of North Korea
Asian Games medalists in table tennis
Table tennis players at the 2002 Asian Games
Table tennis players at the 2006 Asian Games
Asian Games gold medalists for North Korea
Asian Games bronze medalists for North Korea
Medalists at the 2002 Asian Games
Medalists at the 2006 Asian Games
World Table Tennis Championships medalists